Hardinge is a surname.

Hardinge may also refer to:

Hardinge County, New South Wales, Australia
Hardinge, Inc., American machine tool manufacturer

See also
Harding (disambiguation)